The 2022–23 Brown Bears women's basketball team represented Brown University during the 2022–23 NCAA Division I women's basketball season. The Bears, led by third-year head coach Monique LeBlanc, played their home games at the Pizzitola Sports Center and were members of the Ivy League. They finished the season at 11–15, 4–10 to finish in sixth place. They failed to qualify for the Ivy League women's tournament.

Previous season
Brown finished the previous season 6–20, 1–13 in Ivy League play to finish in last place. They failed to qualify for the 2022 Ivy League women's basketball tournament.

Roster

Schedule

|-
!colspan=9 style=| Non-conference regular season

|-
!colspan=9 style=| Ivy League regular season

See also
 2022–23 Brown Bears men's basketball team

References

Brown Bears women's basketball seasons
Brown
Brown
Brown